Kelly Lee may refer to:

 Kelly Lee, a character in the American daytime television soap opera General Hospital
 Kelly Lee, an actress in the 2000 Taiwanese drama film Yi Yi

See also
 Lee Kelly